Angus Bucks, Angus Bills or AC/DC Dollars are fake, United States one-dollar bills featuring Angus Young, the lead guitarist from the Australian rock 'n' roll band AC/DC. Thousands were dropped on the audience as a theatrical gimmick at the end of the song "Moneytalks" during the band's tour to promote their 1990 album The Razors Edge.

Design
Angus Young takes the place of George Washington on the front. On the back in place of the Great Seal and the bald eagle, are the cannon from the band's 1981 album For Those About to Rock We Salute You and a large iron bell representing the song "Hells Bells" from their 1980 album Back In Black.

Additional appearances
They were featured in the music video for "Moneytalks" which can be found on their DVD, Family Jewels.  Additionally, AC/DC concert DVDs subsequent to the release of The Razors Edge, which include "Moneytalks" in the set list, also feature their appearance, for example, Live at Donington.

Collectable
In 1992, copies of AC/DC's Live double album included both a poster and an Angus Buck. They are now collector's items and can be found online from private sellers like eBay.
A different type of Angus Buck was released in AC/DC Backtracks Boxset. It was a replica of an Australian $100 Note, on both sides featuring Angus Young holding two cannonballs with their fuses lit.

Use as actual currency
Coinciding with the Razors Edge tour, the Soviet Union disintegrated.  As a token of thanks for his youthful followers, Boris Yeltsin arranged for AC/DC to add Moscow to the tour.  The venue had to be relocated numerous times due to high demand, eventually settling on an airfield. Due to the volatile political and economic climate, the Soviet rouble was suffering from severe inflation.  For an extremely short period of time, Angus Bucks dropped on the crowd had more value than the rouble itself and were actually used for regular monetary transactions.

References

AC/DC